Zhu Shuai is a Chinese kickboxer.

As of February 2020 he is ranked #5 Bantamweight in the world by Combat Press.

Titles and accomplishments

Amateur
 2013 Liaoning Province -60 kg Sanda Champion
 2015 China -60 kg Kickboxing Champion
 2015 Jingwu Cup -65 kg Champion

Professional
Hero Legends
 2015 Hero Legends China vs Japan 8-man Tournament Champion
 2015 Hero Legends Asia -60 kg Champion
Wu Lin Feng
 2016 Wu Lin Feng Rookie of the Year
 2020 Wu Lin Feng China -63 kg Champion

Kickboxing record

|-  style="background:#fbb;"
| 2023-02-04 || Loss|| align=left| Maksim Petkevich || Wu Lin Feng 2023: Chinese New Year || Tangshan, China || Decision (Unanimous) || 3 ||3:00 
|-  style="background:#cfc;"
| 2022-12-09 || Win || align=left| Jin Ying  || Wu Lin Feng 532, Final  || Zhengzhou, China || Decision (Unanimous)|| 3 ||3:00
|-  style="background:#cfc;"
| 2022-12-09 || Win || align=left| Wei Weiyang  || Wu Lin Feng 532, Semi Final  || Zhengzhou, China || Decision || 3 ||3:00
|-  style="background:#cfc;"
| 2022-09-24 || Win || align=left| San Shun ||  Wu Lin Feng 531|| Zhengzhou, China || Decision (Unanimous) || 3 ||3:00
|-  style="background:#cfc;"
| 2022-03-26 || Win || align=left| Sergey Lutchenko|| Wu Lin Feng 528 || Zhengzhou, China || KO (Left hook) || 1||2:21
|-  style="background:#fbb;"
| 2021-11-27 ||Loss|| align=left| Jin Ying || Wu Lin Feng 2021: World Contender League 7th Stage Contender League Semi Final || Zhengzhou, China || Ext.R Decision (Split) || 4 ||3:00
|-  style="background:#cfc;"
| 2021-09-30 || Win || align=left| Yimireti Tuoheti || Wu Lin Feng 2021: World Contender League 6th Stage || Zhengzhou, China || Decision (Unanimous) || 3 || 3:00 
|-  style="background:#cfc;"
| 2021-05-22 || Win || align=left| Zhang Jun || Wu Lin Feng 2021: World Contender League 3rd Stage || Xin County, China || Decision (Unanimous)|| 3||3:00
|-  style="background:#cfc;"
| 2021-03-27 || Win || align=left| Wei Weiyang || Wu Lin Feng 2021: World Contender League 1st Stage || China || Decision (Unanimous)|| 3 || 3:00
|-  style="background:#fbb;"
| 2021-01-23 || Loss|| align=left| Jin Ying || Wu Lin Feng 2021: Global Kung Fu Festival || Macao, China || Decision (Unanimous) || 3||3:00
|-  style="background:#cfc;"
| 2020-11-14 || Win||align=left| Wang Zhiwei || Wu Lin Feng 2020: China 63kg Championship Tournament Final|| Zhengzhou, China || Decision (Unanimous) || 3 || 3:00 
|-
! style=background:white colspan=9 |
|-  style="background:#cfc;"
| 2020-11-14 || Win||align=left| Ma Yunkang || Wu Lin Feng 2020: China 63kg Championship Tournament Final|| Zhengzhou, China || KO (High Kick) || 2 ||
|-  style="background:#cfc;"
| 2020-11-14 || Win||align=left| Fang Feida || Wu Lin Feng 2020: China 63kg Championship Tournament Quarter Final|| Zhengzhou, China || KO (2 Knockdowns/Left Hook) || 2 || 2:40
|-  style="background:#cfc;"
| 2020-09-23 || Win||align=left| Ma Yunkang || Wu Lin Feng 2020: King's Super Cup 5th Group Stage || Zhengzhou, China || Decision (Unanimous) || 2 ||
|-  style="background:#cfc;"
| 2020-08-03 || Win||align=left| Fang Feida || Wu Lin Feng 2020: King's Super Cup 4th Group Stage|| Zhengzhou, China || Decision  || 3 || 3:00
|-  style="background:#fbb;"
| 2020-05-15 || Loss||align=left| Jin Ying || Wu Lin Feng 2020: King's Super Cup 1st Group Stage|| Zhengzhou, China || Decision (Unanimous) || 3 || 3:00
|-  style="background:#cfc;"
| 2020-01-11||Win ||align=left| Hirotaka Asahisa || Wu Lin Feng 2020: WLF World Cup 2019-2020 Final || Zhuhai, China || Decision (Unanimous) ||3  ||3:00
|- style="background:#CCFFCC;"
| 2019-10-26|| Win ||align=left| Seurhoy Banchamek || Wu Lin Feng 2019: WLF -67kg World Cup 2019-2020 5th Group Stage || Zhengzhou, China || Decision (Unanimous) || 3 || 3:00
|- style="background:#CCFFCC;"
| 2019-07-21|| Win ||align=left| Koya Urabe || Wu Lin Feng 2019: WLF x Krush 103 - China vs Japan || Tokyo, Japan || KO (Straight Right) || 1 || 0:55
|- style="background:#FFBBBB;"
| 2019-04-27|| Loss||align=left| Denis Wosik || Wu Lin Feng 2019: WLF -63kg Championship World Tournament, Quarter FInals  || Zhuhai, China || Decision  || 3 || 3:00
|- style="background:#CCFFCC;"
| 2019-02-23|| Win ||align=left| Cedric Da Silva|| Wu Lin Feng 2019: WLF Championship in Zhengzhou  || Zhengzhou, China || KO (3 Knockdowns) || 1 ||
|- style="background:#FFBBBB;"
| 2018-12-01|| Loss ||align=left| Wang Junyu|| WLF -67kg World Cup 2018-2019 6th Round, -60 kg Contender Tournament Final  || Zhengzhou, China || Decision (Majority) || 3 || 3:00
|-  bgcolor="#CCFFCC"
| 2018-12-01 ||Win ||align=left| Fabrício Andrade || WLF -67kg World Cup 2018-2019 6th Round, -60 kg Contender Tournament Semi Final  || Zhengzhou, China || KO (Left Hook) || 2 || 1:50
|-  style="background:#FFBBBB;"
| 2018-10-13|| Loss||align=left| Ferdaws Nayimi || Wu Lin Feng 2018: China vs Canada || Canada || Decision|| 3 || 3:00
|-  bgcolor="#CCFFCC"
| 2018-08-04 ||Win ||align=left| Eduard Mikhovich || Wu Lin Feng 2018: WLF -67kg World Cup 2018-2019 2nd Round || Zhengzhou, China || Decision || 3 || 3:00
|-  bgcolor="#FFBBBB"
| 2018-06-16 ||Loss ||align=left| Pietro Doorje || Wu Lin Feng 2018: China vs Netherlands & Russia || Shenyang, China || Decision (Unanimous) || 3 || 3:00
|-  bgcolor="#CCFFCC"
| 2018-05-06 ||Win ||align=left| Josh Tonna || Wu Lin Feng 2018: World Championship Nanyang || Nanyang, Henan, China || Decision (Unanimous) || 3 || 3:00
|-  style="background:#FFBBBB;"
| 2018-03-10|| Loss||align=left| Djany Fiorenti || Wu Lin Feng 2018: -60kg World Championship Tournament, Quarter Finals || Jiaozuo, China || Decision|| 3 || 3:00

|-  bgcolor="#CCFFCC"
| 2017-12-15 || Win ||align=left| Sergey || Wu Lin Feng New Generation || Zhengzhou, China || Decision || 3 || 3:00

|-  bgcolor="#CCFFCC"
| 2017-10-07 || Win ||align=left| Ncedo Gomba || Wu Lin Feng 2017: WLF VS ACB & ACB KB 11 || Zhengzhou, China || Decision || 3 || 3:00
|-  bgcolor="#CCFFCC"
| 2017-08-05 || Win||align=left| Somchai Kittisak || Wu Lin Feng 2017: China VS Thailand || Zhengzhou, China || Decision || 3 || 3:00
|-  bgcolor="#FFBBBB"
| 2017-04-01 || Loss ||align=left| Eduard Mikhovich || Wu Lin Feng 2017: China VS Europe 60 kg World Tournament Group C final || Zhengzhou, China || Decision (Unanimous) || 3 || 3:00
|-  bgcolor="#FFBBBB"
| 2017-04-01 || Loss ||align=left| Umar Paskhaev || Wu Lin Feng 2017: China VS Europe 60 kg World Tournament Group C Semifinal 2 || Zhengzhou, China || Decision (Unanimous) || 3 || 3:00
|-
! style=background:white colspan=9 |

|- style="background:#fbb;"
| 2017-02-24|| Loss||align=left| Yuan Ya || Wu Lin Feng New Generation || China || Decision || 3 || 3:00

|- style="background:#CCFFCC;"
| 2016-12-17|| Win ||align=left| Lao Tai|| Dream Hero || China || Decision || 3 || 3:00

|-  bgcolor="#CCFFCC"
| 2016-12-03 || Win ||align=left| Eduard Mikhovich  || Wu Lin Feng 2016: WLF x Krush - China vs Japan|| Zhengzhou, China || Decision (Unanimous) || 3 || 3:00

|- style="background:#CCFFCC;"
| 2016-11-11|| Win ||align=left| Keba || 龙崛 || China || Decision || 3 || 3:00

|- style="background:#CCFFCC;"
| 2016-10-21|| Win ||align=left| Zhao Boshi || Wu Lin Feng New Generation || China || Decision || 3 || 3:00

|- style="background:#CCFFCC;"
| 2016-10-21|| Win ||align=left| Song Mengxiao || Wu Lin Feng New Generation || China || Decision || 3 || 3:00

|- style="background:#fbb;"
| 2016-07-14|| Loss||align=left| Huo Xiaolong || Wu Lin Feng New Generation || China || Decision || 3 || 3:00

|- style="background:#CCFFCC;"
| 2016-07-14|| Win ||align=left| Xu Luzhe || Wu Lin Feng New Generation || China || KO ||  ||

|- style="background:#CCFFCC;"
| 2016-06-25|| Win ||align=left| Li Xiangfeng || Gods of War || China || Decision || 3 || 3:00

|- style="background:#CCFFCC;"
| 2016-05-24|| Win ||align=left| Yuan Ya || Wu Lin Feng New Generation || China || Decision || 3 || 3:00

|- style="background:#CCFFCC;"
| 2016-05-24|| Win ||align=left| || Wu Lin Feng New Generation || China || KO || ||

|- style="background:#CCFFCC;"
| 2016-04-16|| Win ||align=left| Tian Yuan ||  || China || Decision || 3 || 3:00

|- style="background:#fbb;"
| 2016-01-23|| Loss||align=left| Kong Long || Wu Lin Feng New Generation || China || Decision || 3 || 3:00
|- style="background:#CCFFCC;"
| 2015-11-07|| Win ||align=left| Li Zengyang || Wu Lin Feng New Generation || China || Decision || 3 || 3:00
|-  bgcolor="#CCFFCC"
| 2015-10-03 || Win ||align=left| Liu Qiliang ||  || Zhengzhou, China || Decision || 3 || 3:00
|- style="background:#CCFFCC;"
| 2015-08-28|| Win||align=left| Kompayak Sithjombung || Hero Legends|| Dunhuang, China || Decision (Unanimous) || 3 || 3:00
|-
! style=background:white colspan=9 |
|- style="background:#CCFFCC;"
| 2015-07-25|| Win ||align=left| Li Haojie || Hero Legnds, China vs Japan 8-man Tournament, Final || Chongqing, China || Decision || 3|| 3:00 
|-
! style=background:white colspan=9 |
|- style="background:#CCFFCC;"
| 2015-06-25|| Win ||align=left| Mase Okamoto || Hero Legnds, China vs Japan 8-man Tournament, Semi Final || Chongqing, China || KO (Knee to the body) || 1||
|- style="background:#CCFFCC;"
| 2015-06-25|| Win ||align=left| Keisuke Nakamura || Hero Legnds, China vs Japan 8-man Tournament, Quarter Final || Chongqing, China || KO (Spinning back kick to the body) || 3 ||
|- style="background:#FFBBBB;"
| 2015-06-05|| Loss||align=left| Liu Wei  || Hero Legends, China vs Thailand 8-man Tournament, Final || Futian District, China || Decision (Unanimous) || 3 || 3:00
|- style="background:#CCFFCC;"
| 2015-05-15|| Win ||align=left| Pettadi  || Hero Legends, China vs Thailand 8-man Tournament, Semi Final || China || Decision || 3 || 3:00
|- style="background:#CCFFCC;"
| 2015-05-15|| Win ||align=left|  || Hero Legends, China vs Thailand 8-man Tournament, Quarter Final || China || Decision || 3 || 3:00
|- style="background:#CCFFCC;"
| 2015-01-01|| Win||align=left| Song Cheng  || China vs USA || Changsha, China || Decision || 3 || 3:00
|-
| colspan=9 | Legend:

References 

Chinese male kickboxers
Chinese sanshou practitioners
People from Zhoukou
Sportspeople from Henan
1995 births
Living people